Ali Muhammad Mihar Halt railway station (Sindhi: علي محمد مهر هالٽ ريلوي اسٽيشن) is located in Pakistan.

See also
 List of railway stations in Pakistan
 Pakistan Railways

References

Railway stations in Sindh